Šator is a mountain in the Dinaric Alps, in the western regions of Bosnia and Herzegovina. The name šator means "tent".

The mountain area includes a lake, rich flora and fauna, numerous geomorphological and hydrological phenomena, as well as the aesthetic appearance in general.

Geography 
Šator rises some 1000 meters above high plains and enormous karstic fields which surround it. These plains are among highest and most spacious karstic fields in the Dinaric Alps and certainly in Bosnia and Herzegovina.

These mountains divide the Livanjsko field from the Glamočko Polje field.

To the north is deep valley where the Unac River emerge and Župica Lake. On the north-west is an  grassy plateau, and a  mountain of Jadovnik.

The spacious and grassy Grahovsko Polje field is on the west, with an altitude above sea level of around  meters. This whole area is bounded with a long mountain chain, which includes the peaks of Dinara on the border with Croatia.

Peaks 

Šator peaks start rising with a sort of plateau  meters above sea level, at the end of the dense forests of beech, fir and spruce. Those 5 peaks have a shape like tent and form a  string in east–west direction. That is almost perpendicular to most of Dinaric Alps mountains, which stretch in southeast–northwest direction.

From a distance the whole mountain gives the impression of tent and that is how it got its name ( = ). 

Flora and fauna 
South slopes of Šator are grassy, in spring covered with carpets of flowers. On the opposite, north side are steep cliffs and scree slopes (also: talus piles) and karst depression with lot of dwarf pine.
Šator and area around the mountain were enormous pastures for thousands of cattle, which were driven from as far as Dalmatia, but are now almost depopulated.

Tourism 

Šator is a tame mountain in general, in a sense, and therefore more suitable for family trips instead of serious mountaineering.

See also 
 List of mountains in Bosnia and Herzegovina
 Šatorsko Lake
 Prekajsko Lake
 Unac River
 Vrelo Bastašice

References

Mountains of Bosnia and Herzegovina
Tourist attractions in Bosnia and Herzegovina